Astriclypeidae is a family of echinoderms belonging to the order Clypeasteroida.

Genera:
 Amphiope L.Agassiz, 1840
 Astriclypeus Verrill, 1867
 Echinodiscus Leske, 1778
 Kieria Mihály, 1985
 Paraamphiope Stara & Sanciu, 2014
 Sculpsitechinus Stara & Sanciu, 2014
 Tretodiscus

References

 
Clypeasteroida
Echinoderm families